Kommara is a village in West Godavari district in the state of Andhra Pradesh in India.

Demographics
 India census, Kommara has a population of 2859 of which 1423 are males while 1436 are females. The average sex ratio of Kommara village is 1009. The child population is 228, which makes up 7.97% of the total population of the village, with sex ratio 1054. In 2011, the literacy rate of Kommara village was 77.96% when compared to 67.02% of Andhra Pradesh.

See also 
 Eluru

References 

Villages in West Godavari district